Provisioning for sea was crucial in the 19th century due to the lack of modern conveniences such as refrigeration, freeze-drying and canning.  Most foodstuffs and liquids such as spirits, molasses, vinegar, and water, were shipped in casks, the balance in wooden crates and other suitable packing materials.

It was also commonplace to carry live chickens, both for their eggs and meat, and some small livestock such as sheep, which were butchered when their feed ran out, providing fresh meat before barreled stores such as beef and salt pork were consumed.

The fare for officers and rations for the crew were distinct, as were dining accommodations, with each reflecting their relative stations in society and the navy.

Due to the inability to maintain water fresh for extended periods of time prior to the advent of modern hygiene, shipboard plumbing, and disinfectants, it was common to ship large quantities of beer to provide both hydration and nourishment in times when water aboard fouled. The beer's alcoholic content served as a preservative.

In contrast, grog, a mix of rum and water, was provided and consumed daily (with officers provided their rum straight). The rum allotment per man was retained in the United States Navy until the latter part of the 19th century, and all the way until 1970 in the British Royal Navy.

USS Constitution
Ordered on a cruise intended to last at least six months,  sailed on 30 December 1813, with 485 men provisioned as follows:

	

"Beef was stowed on the larboard side and pork to starboard; flour, rice, and peas/beans in the wings. Stowage, as with the water casks below them, is begun from aft and worked forward. Casks in the spirit room are stowed from the forward bulkhead aft. In all cases, the largest containers are closest to the keelson, with sizes diminishing as they are laid outboard. All casks are laid bung up."

Foodstuffs may well be in the hold for months, perhaps years. Two hundred years ago life ashore was tough and life at sea had the advantage that at least you would get three meals a day, however grim they may have been.

"Cooks in the early Navy were left to their own imaginations when it came to preparing meals. In the main, this resulted in whatever was on the official ration for that day of the week being tossed in a ship's coppers and boiled until meal time. The first official Navy cook book was produced by Paymaster F. T. Arms and published by the Bureau of Supplies and Accounts in 1902. It contained five recipes for soup, six for fish, thirty-four for meats, fowl, and eggs, and several for desserts, including "plum duff"."

Comparison
In comparison, on 18 June 1803, Purser James Deblois reported to Commodore Edward Preble that the following provisions would be required for a 400 man crew for a now unknown six months cruise:

Bread 20,000 lbs
Beef 36,000 lbs
Pork 31,200 lbs
Flour 10,400 lbs
Suet 5,200 lbs
Cheese 3,900 lbs
Butter 1,300 lbs
Peas/beans 1,300 gals
Rice 1,300 gals
Molasses 650 gals
Vinegar 650 gals
Wax candles 500 lbs
Tallow candles 500 lbs

See also
 Provisioning (cruise ship)

References

United States Navy